Joseph Olumide (born 10 October 1987) is a Nigerian footballer who plays for VfR Mannheim II.

Club career
In 2006, Olumide made his professional debut for TuS Koblenz in the German Second Division.

He currently plays for SV Wiesbaden.

References

1987 births
Living people
Yoruba sportspeople
Sportspeople from Lagos
Nigerian expatriates in Germany
Nigerian footballers
SV Waldhof Mannheim players
TuS Koblenz players
Hamburger SV II players
SV Wacker Burghausen players
2. Bundesliga players
3. Liga players
SVN Zweibrücken players
1. FC Normannia Gmünd players
Association football forwards